Needham Junction station is an MBTA Commuter Rail station in Needham, Massachusetts. It serves the Needham Line. It is located on Junction Street near Chestnut Street in the southwestern part of Needham. It opened in 1906 when the New Haven Railroad built the Needham Cutoff to connect the Charles River Railroad to its main line. The station has a single side platform with an accessible mini-high platform serving the line's single track.

History

Charles River Railroad
On June 1, 1853, the Charles River Branch Railroad was extended from Newton Upper Falls into Needham as the first stage of a line to Dover and beyond. The railroad was not able to follow its original plan to go through the East Village, Needham's historical center, because one landowner refused to sell; instead, it was routed to Great Plain station in Great Plain Village further to the east.

Needham Cutoff

A wye was constructed at Needham Junction, allowing trains from Needham to use the cutoff as well. West Street station opened with the cutoff on November 4, 1906; it is positioned east of the junction, so as to only serve trains running on the cutoff. No station had previously been located in the area. A large granolithic platform with a canopy over much of its length was completed in 1911, by which point it was known as Needham Junction.

Loop service jointly run by the B&A and the New Haven operated over the cutoff and the Highland branch via Needham from 1911 to 1914; after that, most Needham trains originated at Needham Heights. Service between Newton Highlands and Newton Upper Falls ended in 1927, and between Needham Heights and Newton Upper Falls in 1932, leaving Needham Heights as the terminus of the line.

The West Medway Branch shared the line from Forest Hills to Needham Junction until 1938 and from 1940 to 1955; from 1955 to 1967 the line operated as a shuttle from West Medway ( after 1966) to Needham Junction.

MBTA era
The station was closed with the rest of the line from October 13, 1979 to October 19, 1987 during Southwest Corridor construction. A mini-high platform was added during the closure, making Needham Junction fully handicapped accessible. The original station building is now an ice cream parlor; MBTA tickets are sold as well. Since April 1981, MBTA bus route  has terminated in a loop at the west end of the station parking lot.

References

External links

MBTA  - Needham Junction
Station on Google Maps Street View

Buildings and structures in Needham, Massachusetts
Former New York, New Haven and Hartford Railroad stations
MBTA Commuter Rail stations in Norfolk County, Massachusetts
1906 establishments in Massachusetts
Buildings and structures completed in 1906